Talvadiya Junction railway station is a small railway station in Khandwa district, Madhya Pradesh. Its code is TLV. It serves Talvadiya village. The station consists of two platforms, neither well sheltered. It lacks many facilities including water and sanitation.

References

Railway stations in Khandwa district
Bhopal railway division